Cephalotrigona is a genus of bees belonging to the family Apidae.

The species of this genus are found in Central and Southern America.

Species:

Cephalotrigona capitata 
Cephalotrigona eburneiventer 
Cephalotrigona femorata 
Cephalotrigona oaxacana 
Cephalotrigona zexmeniae

References

GBIF

Meliponini
Bee genera